Zuzana "Suzy" Pramuková (born 11 September 1981) is a Slovak footballer who has played for the Slovakia national team. She plays as forward for Nettleham Ladies of the English East Midlands Regional Women's Football League (EMWFL), having previously represented Lincoln and Rotherham United.

Club career
Pramuková played football in her native Slovakia for Slovan Bratislava and the Jozef Venglos football academy, Polygraf VFA.

OOH Lincoln Ladies (then Lincoln City Ladies) signed Pramuková in 2006. She made 3 FA Women's Premier League Northern Division appearances that season, and only 3 the following season despite 21 goals in 19 reserve matches. After the signing of Amanda Barr in 2008, Pramuková did not play a first team match in 2008/09. She made 6 substitute appearances in 2009/10, before signing for Rotherham United on loan in February 2010.

International career
Pramuková has played for the Slovakia national team.

See also
Football in Slovakia
List of football clubs in Slovakia

References

External links
 Nettleham profile

Living people
1981 births
Footballers from Bratislava
Expatriate women's footballers in England
Notts County L.F.C. players
Slovak women's footballers
Slovak expatriate footballers
Slovakia women's international footballers
FA Women's National League players
Slovak expatriate sportspeople in England
Women's association football forwards
ŠK Slovan Bratislava (women) players